Hilarographa tasekia is a species of moth of the family Tortricidae. It is found in Malaysia.

The wingspan is about 15 mm. The ground colour of the forewings is white, preserved as a subtornal marking followed by a whitish medio-subterminal area. The transverse fasciae are suffused olive brownish, marked with refractive bluish fasciae. The costal strigulae (fine streaks) are grey olive, but white at the costa and subcostally. The hindwings are brown with a white median area.

Etymology
The name refers to the type locality.

References

Moths described in 2009
Hilarographini